Albion is a city in and the county seat of Edwards County, Illinois, United States. The population was 1,971 at the 2020 census. The city was named "Albion" after an ancient and poetic reference to the island of Great Britain.

History
Albion was laid out in 1818 as a utopian community and given the name Albion, a literary name for England.

In 1821, the county seat of Edwards County was moved from Palmyra to Albion, eighteen miles to the west. However, residents of the larger Mount Carmel felt their town should be the county seat. Four companies of militia marched from Mount Carmel towards Albion to seize the county documents stored in the courthouse. The situation was eventually resolved in 1824 by separating Wabash County from Edwards County at Bonpas Creek and making Mount Carmel the seat of Wabash County. The two counties are among the smallest in Illinois.

The township of Albion has a curious link with England and brewing. George Flower and Morris Birkbeck, a Quaker agriculturalist and radical, organised the purchase of 26,400 acres of land in the southern "Illinois Territory," to found Albion and encouraged settlers from England to come and join them. Among them was George's father Richard Flower, an experienced brewer (who at some point taught his son about making popular beer styles of the period, including London Porter). Flower came across the Atlantic with all his remaining children.

The settlement espoused a firm abolitionist ethos, and escaped slaves from Kentucky settled in Albion, encouraged by the Flowers and other community leaders. However, these formerly enslaved people were always in danger of being kidnapped by bounty hunters aiming to return them to slavery. Around 1823-24 one such gang of eight to ten kidnapped a group of free African-American residents of Albion and headed south. They were pursued by an outraged armed party led by Richard’s youngest son, Edward. He was only eighteen years old, but his posse successfully captured the gang "at the rifle's mouth," freed the captives, and took the kidnappers to face judgment under the law.

Friends or ‘business associates’ of the original kidnappers' allies plotted to kill the young Flower or his father in revenge. According to some newspaper reports, a cousin also named Richard was tragically mistaken for Edward’s father and killed in a pre-planned argument and fight. On another occasion, a bullet was fired through a window of Richard's house and smashed a mirror above his head. The family decided that the only safe plan was for Edward Flower to leave the country. Back in England after 1825, he decided to take up the family trade and, after a struggling start, Flower’s Brewery in Stratford-upon-Avon became one of the most famous in England, surviving as a separate company to the 1950s and as a brand to this day. Edward loved Illinois and missed his former life in America with his family. He regretted his forced departure and frequently mused about returning. During the Civil War, Flower spoke at meetings around Britain and Ireland in support of the Union, and against slavery. As a retiree, he made a six-month visit to the US with his wife Celina in 1866, after the war was over.

Geography
Albion is located south of the center of Edwards County.  In it, Illinois Route 130 and Illinois Route 15 meet. Route 130 leads north  to Olney and south  to Grayville, while Route 15 leads east  to Mount Carmel and west  to Fairfield.

A 3.8-magnitude earthquake occurred seven and a half miles outside of the city on September 19, 2017.

Climate

Demographics
As of the 2020 census there were 1,971 people, 926 households, and 532 families residing in the city. The racial makeup of the city was 94.11% White, 0.61% African American, 1.01% Asian, 0.36% Pacific Islander, 0.51% from other races, and 3.40% from two or more races. Hispanic or Latino of any race were 1.52% of the population.

There were 926 households, out of which 46.65% had children under the age of 18 living with them, 38.66% were married couples living together, 15.98% had a female householder with no husband present, and 42.55% were non-families. 36.61% of all households were made up of individuals, and 16.95% had someone living alone who was 65 years of age or older. The average household size was 3.04 and the average family size was 2.36.

The city's age distribution consisted of 27.9% under the age of 18, 7.7% from 18 to 24, 23.5% from 25 to 44, 23.3% from 45 to 64, and 17.5% who were 65 years of age or older. The median age was 38.9 years. For every 100 females, there were 93.1 males. For every 100 females age 18 and over, there were 92.6 males.

The median income for a household in the city was $43,971, and the median income for a family was $64,375. Males had a median income of $37,422 versus $30,370 for females. The per capita income for the city was $24,818. About 16.5% of families and 18.1% of the population were below the poverty line, including 23.4% of those under age 18 and 6.6% of those age 65 or over.

Notable people 

 Harold Huntley Bassett, U.S. Air Force major general
 Morris Birkbeck, first Illinois Secretary of State, one of Albion's founders
 Louis Lincoln Emmerson, served as Secretary of State of Illinois and Governor of Illinois
 Benjamin Orange Flower, Journalist
 Edward Fordham Flower, English brewer
 Harold A. Garman, U.S. Army medic and Medal of Honor recipient in World War II
 Guy U. Hardy, former congressman from Colorado
 Jeff Keener, former pitcher for the St. Louis Cardinals
 H. H. Kohlsaat, publisher and confidante of five U.S. presidents
 Bruce Mendenhall, convicted murderer and alleged serial killer
 George Frederick Pentecost, prominent clergyman, evangelist and co-worker with revivalist D.L. Moody
 William Pickering, fifth governor of Washington Territory

References

Further reading
A History of Edwards County, Illinois, Volume One (1980), Library of Congress Card number 80-70649
Charles Boewe, Prairie Albion: An English Settlement in Pioneer Illinois, Southern Illinois University Press, Carbondale, c. 1962

External links
Albion Chamber of Commerce

Cities in Illinois
Cities in Edwards County, Illinois
County seats in Illinois
Populated places established in 1816
1816 establishments in Illinois Territory